The Soldiers' and Sailors' Arch is a triumphal arch at Grand Army Plaza in Brooklyn, New York City, just north of Prospect Park. Built from 1889 to 1892, the arch is dedicated "To the Defenders of the Union, 1861–1865".

The eastern end with a stairway to the observation deck and crowning sculpture was occasionally open to the public until the early 2000s, when deterioration of the interior made it unsafe for the public.

History

On August 6, 1889, William R. Ware and Charles B. Atwood, who had been appointed by the Soldiers' and Sailors' Monument Commission, selected John H. Duncan's design for the arch from 36 designs submitted the previous year.

Frederick Law Olmsted and Calvert Vaux, in collaboration with architect Stanford White, built the arch after  months of site preparation; William Tecumseh Sherman was the speaker at the 1889 cornerstone, and President Grover Cleveland led the 1892 unveiling.

The McKim, Mead and White firm recommended the bronze statues for the City Beautiful movement, and Park Commissioner Frank Squire engaged Frederick MacMonnies in 1894 to design the three bronze sculptural groupings. The interior arch faces have equestrian bas-reliefs of Abraham Lincoln and Ulysses S. Grant sculpted by William Rudolf O'Donovan (men) and Thomas Eakins (horses), that were added in 1895. Also added in 1895 by sculptor Frederick MacMonnies are the Army and Navy sculptures and the allegorical crowning sculpture. This sculpture depicts the winged goddess of victory, following victorious combat (the Civil War) with instruments of war: sword, colors, flagstaff, and quadriga (the Union Army). Winged attendants are seen removing two of the four quadriga horses for peacetime use (postbellum recovery) while trumpeting the victory and freedom (Emancipation).

The arch was designated a landmark in 1973, and the crowning sculpture was restored after the chariot's figure fell out in 1976. The occasionally publicly accessible observation deck at the top of the Soldiers' and Sailors' Arch was closed in the 2000s because the deck had severely degraded. In 2018, it was announced that as part of a renovation of Grand Army Plaza, the arch's observation deck would be restored and reopened.

See also
 List of post-Roman triumphal arches

References

External links

 Grand Army Plaza Monuments – Soldiers and Sailors Memorial Arch : NYC Parks

 

1895 sculptures
1898 sculptures
Allegorical sculptures in New York City
Beaux-Arts architecture in New York City
Bronze sculptures in Brooklyn
Buildings and structures completed in 1892
1892 establishments in New York (state)
Buildings and structures in Brooklyn
Cultural depictions of Abraham Lincoln
Statues of Ulysses S. Grant
Horses in art
Monuments and memorials in Brooklyn
Grand Army Plaza
New York City Designated Landmarks in Brooklyn
Outdoor sculptures in Brooklyn
Prospect Park (Brooklyn)
Sculptures of goddesses
Sculptures of men in New York City
Sculptures of women in New York City
Statues in New York City
Triumphal arches in the United States
Sculptures by Frederick William MacMonnies
Union (American Civil War) monuments and memorials in New York (state)